Viliame is both a masculine given name and a surname. It may refer to:

Given name
Viliame Cavubati (born 1945), Fijian politician
Viliame Iongi (born 1989), Tongan rugby union player
Viliame Kikau (born 1995). Fijian rugby league player
Viliame Naupoto, Fijian Navy commander and civil servant
Viliame Navoka (died 2007), Fijian diplomat
Viliame Satala (born 1972), Fijian rugby union player
Viliame Seruvakula, Fijian military officer
Viliame Veikoso (born 1982), Fijian rugby union player
Viliame Waqaseduadua (born 1983), New Zealand rugby union player

Surname
Savu Viliame (1906–1986), Fijian cricketer